Mayfield Park is a public park in Manchester city centre, England, covering an area of . The city centre's first new public park in more than 100 years, it was officially opened on 22 September 2022 by Bev Craig, the Leader of Manchester City Council.

Toponymy
The park takes its name from Manchester Mayfield, a former railway station and industrial site on the south side of Fairfield Street next to Manchester Piccadilly station.

History
The area had been mainly derelict since the 1980s, but is being redeveloped as part of a wider regeneration scheme that includes plans for 1,500 new homes, retail, leisure and office space.

The park had been more than six years in the planning, design and delivery. In 2020, the Government pledged £23m of investment from its Getting Building Fund – one of the largest investments in any single project – to Mayfield Park. This investment, delivered through the Greater Manchester Combined Authority (GMCA), was part of the Government's strategy to support ‘shovel ready’ schemes that would help to drive economic recovery following the COVID-19 crisis.

The scheme is being delivered by the Mayfield Partnership, a public-private venture comprising regeneration specialist U+I, Manchester City Council, Transport for Greater Manchester and UK Government placemaking expert LCR.

Features
The park is on the banks of the River Medlock, a section of which was revealed after more than 50 years when concrete culverts were removed during construction. Three of the original steel beams have been retained to create the base of a new bridge over the river, forming part of extensive walkways.

There is a large children's playground with references to the industrial past of the site, as well as landscaped areas with thousands of plants and 140 trees spread across 58 species.

References

Parks and commons in Manchester
Urban public parks